Max Berliner (born Mordcha Berliner; Warsaw, 23 October 1919 - Buenos Aires, 26 August 2019) was a Polish-Argentine actor, author, film director and theater director.

Filmography

Television

References

External links
 

1919 births
2019 deaths
Polish emigrants to Argentina
Jewish Argentine male actors
Argentine male stage actors
Argentine male film actors
Argentine male television actors
Argentine film directors
Argentine theatre directors